Mylavaram, Kadapa district is a village and a mandal in Kadapa district in the state of Andhra Pradesh in India.

References

Villages in Kadapa district